Damera is a village and a mandal in Hanamkonda district in the state of Telangana in India.

 List of Villages in  Damera mandal
1. Oorugonda 

2. Oblapur 

3. Kantathmakur 

4. Kogilvai 

5. Kauvkonda

6. Damera 

7. Pasargonda

8. Pulkurthi 

9. Mustyalpalle

10. Ladalla 

11. Venkatapur 

12. Sarvapur 

13.  Singarajupalle.

References

External links 
 villageinfo.in

Villages in Hanamkonda district
Mandals in Hanamkonda district